Ben Willis may refer to:

 Ben Willis (character), character in the horror film series I Know What You Did Last Summer
 Ben Willis (soccer) (born 1996), American soccer player

See also
 Benjamin Willis (disambiguation)